The Magnum was a large super-heavy-lift rocket designed by NASA's Marshall Space Flight Center during the mid-1990s. The Magnum, which never made it past the preliminary design phase, would have been a launcher some 96 meters (315 feet) tall, on the scale of the Saturn V and was originally designed to carry a human expedition to Mars. It was to have used two strap-on side boosters, similar to the Space Shuttle Solid Rocket Boosters (SRBs), but using liquid fuel instead. Some designs had the strap-on boosters using wings and jet engines, which would enable them to fly back to the launch area after they were jettisoned in flight.  The Magnum was designed to carry around 80 tons of payload into low Earth orbit (LEO).

See also 
 Shuttle-C
 Shuttle-derived vehicle
 Shuttle-Derived Heavy Lift Launch Vehicle presented 2009
 National Launch System, studied from 1991 to 1993
 Constellation program, developed from 2005 to 2009 - cancelled
 Space Launch System, developed and built from 2010 onwards
 Studied Space Shuttle Variations and Derivatives

References

External links
 Information about variants of Magnum
 Low Cost Large Core Vehicle Structures Assessment - final report March 1998 re Magnum Launch Vehicle and Liquid Fly Back Booster.

Cancelled space launch vehicles
Space launch vehicles of the United States